The Southern Vipers are a women's cricket team that represent the South of England.  The Vipers wear an orange and black kit and play their home matches at the Ageas Bowl and the County Cricket Ground, Hove.

They are currently coached by former England Women's captain and former player Charlotte Edwards. The Southern Vipers are partnered with Hampshire, Sussex, Berkshire, Buckinghamshire, Dorset, Oxfordshire and the Isle of Wight Cricket Board.

The Vipers were originally formed in 2016 to compete in the Women's Cricket Super League, and won the inaugural competition, winning all but one of their group games, and then defeating Western Storm at the finals day held at Chelmsford by 7 wickets. In 2020, women's cricket in England was reformed, but the Southern Vipers brand was retained, and they won the first two editions of the 50-over Rachael Heyhoe Flint Trophy, beating the Northern Diamonds in the final both times. They won their first Charlotte Edwards Cup in 2022, beating Central Sparks in the final.

History

2016–2019: Women's Cricket Super League

Southern Vipers were formed in 2016 to compete in the new Women's Cricket Super League, partnering with Hampshire CCC, Sussex CCC and various cricket boards across South England. In their inaugural season, they topped the group stage, winning four of their five games, progressing straight to the final. In the final, the Vipers faced Western Storm, who they beat by 7 wickets to claim the inaugural WCSL title.

2017 saw continued success for Southern Vipers, as they again topped the group stage, with four wins. In the final, they faced Western Storm in a rematch of the previous year, but this time the result was reversed, as Storm were victorious by 7 wickets. The Vipers were unable to replicate their form in 2018, finishing bottom of the group, with just two wins from ten games.

In 2019 Women's Cricket Super League, however, Southern Vipers competed in their third Finals Day after qualifying third in the group, with four wins and a tie. After beating Loughborough Lightning in the semi-final, the Vipers again faced Western Storm in the final. Danni Wyatt's 73 helped Southern Vipers to 172/7 batting first, but Storm chased down the target with one over to spare.  Wyatt ended the tournament as the leading run-scorer and Player of the Tournament.

2020– : Domestic Regional Hub

In 2020, women's cricket in England was restructured, creating eight new 'regional hub' teams, with the intention of playing both 50-over and 20-over cricket. The Southern Vipers brand was retained after this restructuring, with some differences to the squad and coaching staff. Due to the COVID-19 pandemic, the 2020 season was truncated, and only 50-over cricket was played, in the Rachael Heyhoe Flint Trophy. Southern Vipers won all 6 of their group stage games, finishing top of the South Group and progressing to the Final, where they faced the Northern Diamonds. The Vipers, batting first, reached 150-1 before collapsing to 231 all out, with captain Georgia Adams top scoring with 80. Vipers spinner Charlotte Taylor then took 6/34 as Northern Diamonds were bowled out for 193, meaning that the Vipers won the inaugural Rachael Heyhoe Flint Trophy. Adams and Taylor were the leading run-scorer and wicket-taker in the tournament, respectively. At the end of the season, five Vipers players were given full-time domestic contracts, the first of their kind in England: Georgia Adams, Tara Norris, Paige Scholfield, Lauren Bell and Maia Bouchier.

The following season, 2021, Southern Vipers competed in both the Rachael Heyhoe Flint Trophy and the newly-formed Twenty20 competition, the Charlotte Edwards Cup. In the Charlotte Edwards Cup the side progressed to Finals Day as the best second-placed team, winning four of their six matches in Group A. However, they lost to Northern Diamonds in the semi-final, being bowled out for 117 in response to the Diamonds' 135/6. In the Rachael Heyhoe Flint Trophy, Southern Vipers progressed directly to the final after topping the group, winning six of their seven matches. In the final they again faced Northern Diamonds, in a repeat of the previous year's match. Bowling first, the Vipers restricted their opponents to 183, but were in turn reduced to 109/7 in reply. However, an unbeaten stand of 78 for the 8th wicket between Emily Windsor (47*) and Tara Norris (40*) saw Southern Vipers home with 2 balls to spare.

Ahead of the 2022 season, Southern Vipers launched the South Central Counties Cup, a 50-over tournament for the counties that make up the Vipers region. That season, they won their first Charlotte Edwards Cup, going unbeaten in the group stage before beating Central Sparks in the final. They again qualified for the final of the Rachael Heyhoe Flint Trophy, this time via the play-off, beating South East Stars by 6 wickets after qualifying third in the initial group stage. They again played Northern Diamonds in the final, the third consecutive encounter between the two sides, but this time Vipers lost by two runs.

Home grounds

Players

Current squad
As per 2022 season.
 No. denotes the player's squad number, as worn on the back of their shirt.
  denotes players with international caps.

Academy
The Southern Vipers Academy team plays against other regional academies in friendly and festival matches across various formats. The Academy selects players from across the Southern Vipers regional hub, and includes some players who are also in the first team squad. Players in the 2022/23 Academy are listed below:

Overseas players
  Suzie Bates – New Zealand (2016–2019)
  Sara McGlashan – New Zealand (2016)
  Morna Nielsen – New Zealand (2016)
  Hayley Matthews – West Indies (2017)
  Mignon du Preez – South Africa (2017–2018)
  Amelia Kerr – New Zealand (2018)
  Stafanie Taylor – West Indies (2019)
  Amanda-Jade Wellington – Australia (2019)
  Gaby Lewis – Ireland (2021)

Coaching staff

 Head Coach: Charlotte Edwards
 Regional Director: Adam Carty

As of the 2022 season.

Seasons

Women's Cricket Super League

Rachael Heyhoe Flint Trophy

Charlotte Edwards Cup

Statistics

Women's Cricket Super League

 Abandoned matches are counted as NR (no result)
 Win or loss by super over or boundary count are counted as tied.

Rachael Heyhoe Flint Trophy

 Abandoned matches are counted as NR (no result)
 Win or loss by super over or boundary count are counted as tied.

Charlotte Edwards Cup

 Abandoned matches are counted as NR (no result)
 Win or loss by super over or boundary count are counted as tied.

Records

Women's Cricket Super League 

Highest team total: 184/4, v Yorkshire Diamonds on 25 August 2019.
Lowest team total: 91, v Western Storm on 31 July 2018.
Highest individual score: 119*, Suzie Bates v Loughborough Lightning on 15 August 2017.
Best individual bowling analysis: 4/10, Linsey Smith v Yorkshire Diamonds on 8 August 2016.
Most runs: 983 in 33 matches, Suzie Bates.
Most wickets: 35 wickets in 28 matches, Tash Farrant.

Rachael Heyhoe Flint Trophy 
Highest team total: 309/9, v Sunrisers  on 12 September 2021.
Lowest (completed) team total: 104 v Central Sparks on 5 June 2021.
Highest individual score: 154*, Georgia Adams v Western Storm on 13 September 2020.
Best individual bowling analysis: 6/34, Charlotte Taylor v Northern Diamonds on 27 September 2020.
Most runs: 951 runs in 23 matches, Georgia Adams.
Most wickets: 37 wickets in 21 matches, Charlotte Taylor.

Charlotte Edwards Cup
Highest team total: 162/4, v Central Sparks on 25 August 2021.
Lowest (completed) team total: 117 v Northern Diamonds on 5 September 2021.
Highest individual score: 88*, Georgia Adams v Central Sparks on 25 August 2021.
Best individual bowling analysis: 5/19, Charlie Dean v Central Sparks on 26 June 2021.
Most runs: 360 runs in 14 matches, Georgia Adams.
Most wickets: 19 wickets in 9 matches, Charlie Dean.

Honours
 Women's Cricket Super League:
 Champions (1) – 2016
 Rachael Heyhoe Flint Trophy:
 Champions (2) – 2020 & 2021
 Charlotte Edwards Cup:
 Champions (1) – 2022

See also
 Berkshire Women cricket team
 Buckinghamshire Women cricket team
 Dorset Women cricket team
 Hampshire Women cricket team
 Oxfordshire Women cricket team
 Sussex Women cricket team
 Southampton Solent University

References

 
Women's Cricket Super League teams
2016 establishments in England
Cricket clubs established in 2016
Sport in Southampton
Cricket in Hampshire
English Domestic Women's Cricket Regional Hub teams